Brayton Howard Ransom (March 24, 1879 – September 17, 1925) was an American zoologist and veterinary parasitologist who served as Chief of the Zoological Division, Bureau of Animal Industry, United States Department of Agriculture from 1906 until his death at age 46. He was a founding member of both the American Society of Parasitologists and the Helminthological Society of Washington, a fellow of the American Association for the Advancement of Science, and served on the editorial boards of the Journal of Parasitology and the American Journal of Tropical Medicine.

References

External links

1879 births
1925 deaths
American parasitologists
American zoologists
United States Department of Agriculture officials
Fellows of the American Association for the Advancement of Science
People from Harrison County, Iowa
Bureau of Animal Industry